A top ten list is a list of the ten highest-ranking items of a given category.

Top Ten or Top 10 may also refer to:

Media
Top 10, a common record chart for the ten most popular songs of the week in the musical chart of a country
America's Top 10, a television program hosted by Casey Kasem among others
Top 10 (comics), a comic book published by DC Comics
Top 10 (Canadian TV program), a Canadian television program broadcast on NHL Network showing the Top 10 in various categories
Top Ten (U.S. TV program), an American television program broadcast on Military Channel about top military weapons and systems
Late Show Top Ten List, a regular segment on the Late Show with David Letterman
ScrewAttack's Top 10, a video game-related web series

Places
Top Ten Club, a club in Hamburg, Germany made famous as an early venue for the Beatles

Brands
Topten, a South Korean clothing brand
TopTen, an Estonian record label

Other uses
Top10 (rugby union), Italy's top-level professional men's rugby union competition